Snowbody Loves Me is a 1964 Tom and Jerry short produced and directed by Chuck Jones (third made but fifth released). It contains music from familiar Chopin pieces; notably, the Revolutionary Étude; the Grande Valse Brillante in E-flat major; and the Fantaisie-Impromptu.

Plot
Jerry, out during a snowstorm in Gulmarg, is caught up in a snowball and rolls all the way into a pillar as the title card and credits are shown. Jerry rolls himself around as a side effect from being in the snowball until he runs into another pillar and sees a cheese shop. Jerry then peeks through the window and he sees the cheeses. He raps on the door and wakes up Tom, who promptly opens the door, only to find no one there. He walks out into the cold; however, Jerry sneaked in under the cat and the door closes on Tom. Tom soon gets cold and does everything he can to stay warm. Tom then peeks through the window and sees Jerry making a fire. His grin is invidious. He tries to enter through the chimney (using an animation sequence Jones would later recycle in How the Grinch Stole Christmas!), but Jerry happens to have chosen that moment to light the fire. Jerry hears Tom being thrown around, yelling in pain, and falling off the edge of the building. While Tom falls from a duct, Jerry is a bit puzzled.

Jerry surveys the large array of cheeses and walks in the air towards a large wheel of Appenzeller cheese. He starts to dive in and out of the holes in the cheese as Tom manages to open the door. Only his tail remains unfrozen, and Tom uses it to push himself and to light a fire to defrost. Jerry starts to eat the Appenzeller and yodels. Tom hears and sees Jerry through the holes and pumps out the mouse with a fireplace Bellows, but he falls back in before Tom can grab him. The cat tries this some more before he comes up with another plan. He hammers corks into all of the holes (hitting Jerry on the head) and drops a giant weight on top of giant bellows, which causes the cheese to explode while corks fly everywhere. Tom recovers from the storm to see much of the cheese gone and Jerry with a cheese-tutu. Jerry walks out, and seeing the tutu, does a brief dance (the music is a rendition of the Grande Valse Brillante, which is also heard in The Flying Cat). Tom applauses, approaching Jerry, but when he gets close to the mouse, he smacks him between his paws, stunning the mouse "out cold" and tosses him outside into the snowstorm.

Tom goes back to sleep but soon feels guilty for what he has just done and shivers in guilt. He imagines Jerry's spirit flying past him (similar to the moves in The Night Before Christmas). Fearing Jerry is frozen solid, he rushes outside with a change of heart, and immediately brings the frozen mouse inside. Tom wraps Jerry up in a warm blanket and revives the mouse with a tablespoon of 180-proof Schnapps, saving him from hypothermia. Jerry regains consciousness and collides along with a pile of dolls and puts on a Swiss outfit from those dolls. Tom plays the piano, and Jerry happily admires and dances around to the music until the cartoon closes.

External links

1964 short films
1964 animated films
1964 films
1960s animated short films
Tom and Jerry short films
Short films directed by Chuck Jones
Films directed by Maurice Noble
Films scored by Eugene Poddany
1960s American animated films
Films set in Switzerland
Films set in the Alps
American comedy-drama films
Animated films without speech
1964 comedy-drama films
Metro-Goldwyn-Mayer short films
Metro-Goldwyn-Mayer animated short films
MGM Animation/Visual Arts short films
Films with screenplays by Michael Maltese
1960s English-language films
Comedy-drama short films